Netball at the 1985 South Pacific Mini Games in Rarotonga, the Cook Islands was held from 31 July to 9 August 1985.

Results

Pool games

Gold Medal match

Final standings

See also
 Netball at the Pacific Games

References

1985 Pacific Games
Netball at the Pacific Games
1985 in netball
International netball competitions hosted by the Cook Islands